Constantina Akkelidou is a Cypriot politician. She was Minister for Health in Cyprus from 1 March 2003 to 26 November 2004.

Akkelidou, a member of the Progressive Party of Working People (AKEL), was a minister under President Tassos Papadopoulos. In 2004 she sent a letter to a judge in Larnaca, requesting that the judge be lenient with a particular defendant, described as a reformed drug addict. Tried in Nicosia District Court, she was found guilty of interfering with the course of justice on 26 November 2004, and resigned her cabinet post. In April 2005 her conviction was overturned by a Supreme Court decision, a decision which led to the resignation of Solon Nikitas as Attorney General. Akkelidou was appointed special advisor to the European Commission for health and consumer protection.

References

Year of birth missing (living people)
Living people
Health ministers of Cyprus
Women government ministers of Cyprus